The Arlington Avenue Historic District is a historic district in Youngstown, Ohio, United States.  It contained 38 contributing buildings when it was listed on the National Register of Historic Places in 1974. Due to various urban renewal projects beginning in the late 1970s, only two of the original structures remain today.

Historic uses 
Single Dwelling

References 

Historic districts on the National Register of Historic Places in Ohio
Geography of Mahoning County, Ohio
National Register of Historic Places in Mahoning County, Ohio